Argophyllum iridescens is a plant in the Argophyllaceae family endemic to a small part of north eastern Queensland. It was described and named in 2018.

Taxonomy
This species was first described, along with a number of other new species in this genus, in 2018 by the Australian botanists Anthony Bean and Paul Forster who published it in the Journal Austrobaileya. The type specimen was collected by Forster in 1999 at Mount Hedly, near Rossville, Queensland.

Etymology
The genus name Argophyllum is derived from Ancient Greek Árgos meaning white or shining, and phúllon meaning leaf. It refers to the white colouration of the underside of the leaves. The species epithet iridescens is from the Latin iridēscēns (iridescent), referring to very shiny undersurface of the leaves.

Distribution and habitat
A. iridescens is restricted to two small disjunct populations in the Wet Tropics of Queensland. The more northerly population occurs around Mount Hedly, south of Cooktown; the other is in the vicinity of Noah Creek, between the Daintree River and Cape Tribulation.

Conservation
This species is listed by the Queensland Department of Environment and Science as least concern. , it has not been assessed by the IUCN.

References

External links
 View a map of recorded sightings of Argophyllum iridescens at the Australasian Virtual Herbarium

Endemic flora of Australia
Flora of Queensland
Taxa named by Paul Irwin Forster
Taxa named by Anthony Bean
Argophyllaceae